Stemphylium alfalfae is a plant pathogen infecting alfalfa.

References

External links 
 Index Fungorum
 USDA ARS Fungal Database

Fungal plant pathogens and diseases
Pleosporaceae